Morris Clyde Lewis III (born October 21, 1969) is a former American football linebacker who played in the National Football League for 13 seasons with the New York Jets. After playing college football at Georgia, Lewis was selected by the Jets in the third round of the 1991 NFL Draft. He was named to three Pro Bowls and was a first-team All-Pro during his career, in addition to being a member of the Jets All-Time Four Decade Team. His accomplishments, however, would be overshadowed by him injuring New England Patriots quarterback Drew Bledsoe in 2001, which inadvertently began a dynasty for the Patriots when they relieved Bledsoe with Tom Brady.

Career

Lewis was a star at the University of Georgia, wearing the number 57 as he would in his pro career. Lewis played 200 games as a Jet, the third-longest tenure in franchise history, and was one of the most loved team players and captains of his time. He was a three-time Pro Bowler (1998, 1999, 2000), was the Jets' defensive captain from 1997 to 2003 and was named to the NFL All-Pro team after the 1998 season. Lewis retired after the 2003 season with 1,231 tackles (883 solo), 52.5 sacks, 14 interceptions for 241 yards, 79 pass deflections, 29 forced fumbles, 13 fumble recoveries for 74 yards and five defensive touchdowns in 200 career games.

Impact on NFL History

While Lewis had a productive career, he is best known for being the catalyst for starting the New England Patriots dynasty that would span two decades. During an early-season game against the Patriots, Lewis leveled Patriots' quarterback Drew Bledsoe with a hard, but clean hit. Bledsoe was about to dive for the first-down marker, but defensive end Shaun Ellis clipped Bledsoe's ankles, resulting in Bledsoe taking the full force of the hit while standing straight up. Tom Brady, a sixth-round draft pick in the 2000 NFL Draft, was the back-up quarterback and finished the game.

It turned out that Lewis' hit sheared a blood vessel in Bledsoe's chest, causing Bledsoe to lose a pint of blood an hour. Bledsoe would never regain his starting job (he was traded to Buffalo after the season), The Patriots went 11-3 for the remainder of the season, culminating in the team's first Super Bowl title on February 3, 2002.

Over the next two decades, the Patriots won six Super Bowl titles and Brady would win a seventh in Tampa Bay. As a result, Lewis' hit on Bledsoe is often noted for its impact on NFL history. The hit appeared on the NFL's list of 100 greatest game changers, ranking at 82.

Personal life
Lewis and his wife Christalyn live in Atlanta, Georgia and have two sons.

References

1969 births
Living people
African-American players of American football
American Conference Pro Bowl players
American football linebackers
Georgia Bulldogs football players
New York Jets players
Players of American football from Atlanta